Gravura is a script typeface of the copperplate model designed by British type designer Phill Grimshaw in 1995. This typeface is known for its handwriting style often describing as elegant.

Notable uses 
Gravura was used in the book Images of Missouri by Clair Wilcox.
Script typefaces

References